Luca Pinelli (1542 Melfi; 1607 Naples) was an Italian jesuit and theologian.

Life 
Born at Melfi, Basilicata, to a family from the Republic of Genoa, in 1562 he entered the Society of Jesus, where he taught theology and philosophy. Subsequently, he was sent to Germany and France to combat Protestantism, teaching theology at the universities of Ingolstadt (1575-1577) and Pont-a-Mousson (1577-1580). Under his influence, the two universities adopted Summa Theologica by Thomas Aquinas as a textbook.

Returned in Italy, Pinelli became rector at the colleges of Florence, Perugia and Palermo, where he composed most of his ascetical writings. Then he moved to Naples, where he died in 1607.

Works
De Statu Animarum In Altero Seculo (1577)
Theologica Disputatio De Christo Opt. Max. Ac Matre Eivs Sanctissima (1577)
De ecclesia theologica disputatio (1580)
Libretto di brevi meditazioni del Santiss. Sacramento (1598)
Meditationi Utilissime, Sopra I Quindeci Misterii Del Rosario, Della Sacratissima Vergine Maria (1602)
Piae meditationes de Sanctissimo Eucharistiae sacramento (1603)
Brevi Meditationi Sopra Quattro Novissimi Dell'Huomo (1605)
Trattato delle sante indulgenze. Et del modo di quadagnarle così per i vivi, come peri morti (1607)
Quaranta Essercitii Spirituali, Per L'Oratione delle Quaranta Hore (1609)
Trattato del valore, et meravigliosi frutti della S. Messa (1609)

Bibliography 
John Richard Roberts, A critical anthology of English recusant devotional prose, 1558-1603, Duquesne University Press, 1966

1542 births
1607 deaths
People from Melfi
16th-century Italian Jesuits
16th-century Italian Roman Catholic theologians